David Raya Martín (born 15 September 1995) is a Spanish professional footballer who plays as a goalkeeper for  club Brentford and the Spain national team. He began his senior career with Blackburn Rovers and transferred to Brentford in 2019.

Club career

Blackburn Rovers
Born in Barcelona, Raya began his career in his native Spain, combining goalkeeping with playing as an outfield player in futsal. He later played youth football for UE Cornellà, before moving to England to join Blackburn Rovers on a scholarship in July 2012. Two years earlier, the transfer of Hugo Fernández to Ewood Park had led to an agreement between the two clubs for UE Cornellà players to join Blackburn Rovers for trials. He progressed through the club's academy and signed a professional contract on 26 February 2014. Raya gained his first senior experience with a four-month spell on loan at Conference Premier club Southport during the first half of the 2014–15 season and made 24 appearances. After his return to Ewood Park, he made two late-season Championship appearances and signed a new three-year contract in April 2015.

Despite making just 13 appearances during the 2015–16 and 2016–17 seasons, Raya was Rovers' second-choice goalkeeper behind Jason Steele and was a frequent member of the matchday squad. Rovers' relegation to League One at the end of the 2016–17 season saw Raya take over as the club's first-choice goalkeeper. He made 47 appearances during the 2017–18 season and helped the club to automatic promotion straight back to the Championship. He retained in his place during 2018–19 and made 46 appearances during a season of consolidation in the Championship. Raya departed Rovers in July 2019, after making 108 appearances for the club.

Brentford

On 6 July 2019, Raya signed for Championship club Brentford on a four-year contract for an undisclosed fee, reported to be in the region of £3 million. Raya's performances during the first half of the 2019–20 season earned him a nomination for Goalkeeper of the Year at the 2020 London Football Awards and his 16 clean sheets in league matches during the season saw him share the EFL Golden Glove award with Bartosz Białkowski. Raya made 49 appearances during a season which ended with a 2–1 2020 Championship play-off Final defeat to West London rivals Fulham.

Injury and transfer speculation led to Raya being left out of head coach Thomas Frank's matchday squads during the 2020–21 pre-season and early in the regular season. After being reintegrated with two EFL Cup appearances and captaining the team in both matches, he signed a new four-year contract on 2 October 2020. Raya finished the 2020–21 season with 48 appearances, 17 clean sheets and a promotion medal, earned with a 2–0 2021 Championship play-off Final victory over Swansea City. In his growing role as a sweeper-keeper, Raya attempted 300 more passes than any other Championship goalkeeper during the season.

Raya began the 2021–22 season as an ever-present in Premier League matches, before suffering a posterior cruciate ligament injury during a 2–1 defeat to Leicester City on 24 October 2021. He returned to outdoor training on 10 January 2022. After a behind closed doors friendly appearance on 1 February 2022, Raya made his return to competitive match play with a start in a 4–1 FA Cup fourth round defeat to Everton four days later. He was an ever-present until the end of the campaign and finished a mid-table season with 25 appearances.

Raya continued as an ever-present in league matches during the 2022–23 season and his performances during an unbeaten January 2023 (during which Brentford challenged the European places) saw him nominated for the Premier League Player of the Month award. That same month, Raya rejected a second offer of a new contract.

International career 
After failing to receive a call-up by Spain at youth level, Raya won his maiden international call-up to the senior team for a pair of friendlies in March 2022. He made his debut with a start in a 2–1 win over Albania on 26 March and remained an unused substitute in the second match. Raya was an unused substitute in all six of Spain's 2022–23 UEFA Nations League A fixtures. In November 2022, Raya was named in Spain's 2022 World Cup squad. Prior to the team's exit in the round of 16, his only match play during the period came with a second half substitute appearance in a pre-tournament friendly versus Jordan.

Style of play 
A sweeper-keeper, Raya "is renowned as a vocal keeper, as well as one who is adept with the ball at his feet". He "can play out from the back and is happy covering the space in behind", which allows a team "to play with a high line". As a result of his and Brentford's style of play during the 2020–21 season, Raya attempted 300 more passes than any other goalkeeper in the Championship.

Personal life
Raya grew up in Pallejà and is a Real Madrid supporter.

Career statistics

Club

International

Honours

Blackburn Rovers
EFL League One runner-up: 2017–18

Brentford
EFL Championship play-offs: 2021

Individual
 EFL Golden Glove: 2019–20 (shared)

References

External links

David Raya at brentfordfc.com
David Raya at rfef.es

1995 births
Living people
Footballers from Barcelona
Spanish footballers
Association football goalkeepers
Spain international footballers
UE Cornellà players
Blackburn Rovers F.C. players
Southport F.C. players
Brentford F.C. players
National League (English football) players
English Football League players
Premier League players
2022 FIFA World Cup players
Spanish expatriate footballers
Spanish expatriate sportspeople in England
Expatriate footballers in England